Fruitvale is an unincorporated community in Adams County in the U.S. state of Idaho.

History
Fruitvale's population was estimated at 100 in 1960.

References

Unincorporated communities in Adams County, Idaho
Unincorporated communities in Idaho